Dragonstar or Dragon Star may refer to:

 Dragonstar (role-playing game), a 2001 role-playing game
 Dragonstar (novel series), a 1980-1989 science-fiction series
 Dragon Star trilogy, a 1991-1993 fantasy novel series
 Dragon Star Varnir, a 2019 role-playing video game